James Rhodes (29 January 1946 – 4 March 2015) was an English professional golfer. He turned professional in 1963 and worked as a club professional, making only occasional appearances on the European Tour. In 1987 he won the European Club Professionals Championship in The Netherlands. He joined the European Seniors Tour when he turned fifty and has been one of its most consistent players, winning three tournaments and finishing fifth on the Order of Merit in his best season, which was 1997. As of the 2010 season, he was ninth on the tour's career money list.

Professional wins (5)

Other wins (2)
1987 European Club Professionals Championship
2000 PGA Senior Club Professional Championship

European Senior Tour wins (3)

European Senior Tour playoff record (0–2)

Team appearances
Praia d'El Rey European Cup: 1997 (winners), 1998 (tie)

References

External links

English male golfers
European Senior Tour golfers
People from Cannock
1946 births
2015 deaths